Ensdorf is a municipality in the district of Amberg-Sulzbach in Bavaria in Germany.

Population development
Inhabitants:

1933: 825 
1939: 761 
1961: 1765 
1970: 1902 
1987: 1934 
1995: 2142 
2000: 2222 
2010: 2227 
2015: 2219

Mayor
Since May 2020 Hans Ram (SPD) is the mayor.

References

Amberg-Sulzbach